The 2012–13 Murray State Racers men's basketball team represented Murray State University during the 2012–13 NCAA Division I men's basketball season. The Racers, led by second year head coach Steve Prohm, played their home games at the CFSB Center and were members of the West Division of the Ohio Valley Conference. They finished the season 21–10, 10–6 in OVC play to be champions of the West Division. They advanced to the championship game of the OVC tournament where they lost to Belmont in overtime. Despite the 21 wins, they did not participate in a post season tournament.

Roster

Before the season, sophomore guard Zay Jackson was suspended for the 2012–13 season after pleading guilty to reduced charges stemming from a September 2012 incident in which he was accused of hitting two people with his car in a Walmart parking lot.

Schedule

|-
!colspan=9| Exhibition

|-
!colspan=9| Regular season

|-
!colspan=9| 2013 OVC Basketball tournament

References

Murray State Racers men's basketball seasons
Murray State